Everything Playing is the fourth studio album and sixth overall by the Lovin' Spoonful (including two soundtrack albums), released in 1967.

History
Everything Playing was the first album featuring guitarist Jerry Yester (replacing Zal Yanovsky who left shortly after recording "Six O'Clock") and the last commercial album as a quartet; principal songwriter and lead singer John Sebastian would leave the group in June 1968 for a solo career.  This album also features the only known track to feature bassist Steve Boone on lead vocal: "Priscilla Millionaira".

Three of the songs made the Top 40: "Six O'Clock," "She Is Still a Mystery," and "Money". John Sebastian sang "Younger Generation" in his unscheduled appearance at Woodstock, dedicating it to an audience member whose wife or girlfriend had had a baby at the festival.

The songs were recorded at Mirasound Studios in Manhattan using a prototype 16-track tape recorder which was custom built for the studio by Ampex. This was one of the earliest recordings to use 16-track technology. 

Everything Playing was re-issued on CD in 2003 with three bonus tracks — alternate versions of songs from the original recording.

Reception

In his Allmusic review, music critic William Ruhlman wrote of the album "When Sebastian wasn't at the mic, the singing could be mediocre, and the group was often all over the map in its attempt at musical sophistication, but the record was saved by Sebastian's writing and singing."

Track listing
All songs by John Sebastian unless otherwise noted.

Side one
 "She Is Still a Mystery" – 3:00
 "Priscilla Millionaira" – 2:20
 "Boredom" – 2:23
 "Six O'Clock" – 2:38
 "Forever" (Steve Boone) – 4:24

Side two
 "Younger Generation" – 2:40
 "Money" – 2:01
 "Old Folks" (Joe Butler) – 3:04
 "Only Pretty, What a Pity" (Butler, Jerry Yester) – 3:04
 "Try a Little Bit" – 3:04
 "Close Your Eyes" (Sebastian, Yester) – 2:44

2003 Reissue Bonus Tracks
"She Is Still a Mystery (Alternate Version)" – 3:11
 "Only Pretty, What a Pity (Alternate Version)" – 2:57
 "Try a Little Bit (Alternate Version)" – 3:02

Personnel
John Sebastian – vocals, guitar, cover art
Steve Boone – bass, vocals
Joe Butler – drums, percussion, vocals
Jerry Yester – guitar, banjo, vocals, keyboards
Zal Yanovsky - guitar on "Six O'Clock"

References

The Lovin' Spoonful albums
1967 albums
Kama Sutra Records albums
Albums produced by Joe Wissert